Smedmore may refer to:

Smedmore, Dorset
Smedmore, New South Wales